The Odd Couple II is a 1998 American buddy comedy film and the sequel to the 1968 film The Odd Couple. It was the final film written and produced by Neil Simon, and starring Jack Lemmon and Walter Matthau. Released nearly three decades later, it is unique among sequels for having one of the longest gaps between the release of both films in which all leads return. The Odd Couple II premiered on April 10, 1998, and was a critical and commercial failure, grossing less than half than its predecessor at the box office.

Plot
It has been seventeen years since Oscar Madison and Felix Ungar have seen one another. Oscar is still hosting a regular poker game and is still an untidy slob, now living in Sarasota, Florida, but still a sportswriter. One day, he is called by his son Brucey with an invitation to California for his wedding the following Sunday. A second shock for Oscar—the woman his son is marrying is Felix's daughter, Hannah.

On the flight from New York to Los Angeles, it becomes clear that Felix has not changed his ways—he is still a fussy, allergy-suffering neat freak nuisance. Oscar and Felix are reunited at the airport and very happy to be together again after 17 years of separation—at least for a couple of minutes. They share a rental car to San Malina for the wedding. however the trip begins with Oscar forgetting Felix's suitcase at the Budget car rental, including wedding gifts and wardrobe inside. On the trip, Felix falls asleep and Oscar takes a wrong turn onto the freeway, then loses the directions to San Malina when his cigar ashes burn them.

He and Felix become hopelessly lost, and cannot remember the name of the town where they are headed, so many California cities sounding alike. They end up in a rural area and argue about Felix's lost suitcase, when the rental car rolls off a cliff and catches fire. If that were not enough, they get arrested several times by the same local police in Santa Menendez, first for catching a ride in a truck carrying illegal Mexican immigrants.  They are released after the truck driver confesses, and learn the name of the town where the wedding will take place.  At a bar in town, they meet two extroverted women, Thelma and Holly, and buy them drinks. Accepting an offer of a ride from a stranger even older than themselves, Felix and Oscar end up inside a $150,000 vintage Rolls-Royce Silver Wraith and trapped on the wrong side of the road when the stranger dies unexpectedly. Felix and Oscar are arrested a second time by the same Santa Menendez police, but again are released when it is discovered that the elderly man died of natural causes.  Frustrated that this is second time they have been arrested in Santa Menendez, the police chief advises Oscar and Felix to take a bus to San Malina.

On the bus, they meet Thelma and Holly, who are running away from their redneck husbands.  However, the bus gets stopped by the husbands, who take their wives, along with Oscar and Felix, at gunpoint, and in their car tell them that they are going to "cook a couple of fine geezers" in the woods for flirting with their wives.

Somehow the bus driver is able to inform the police of the husbands' use of a gun on a public vehicle, and their car is stopped at a police roadblock before anything happens to Oscar and Felix. Everyone is again taken into custody by the Santa Menendez police.

After meeting with the police chief for the third time, the boys are freed and driven directly to the local airport by the police, who are only too pleased to be rid of them, especially the chief, who tells his deputies not to arrest them again even if they were to commit notorious crimes. A woman boarding the airplane is also en route to the wedding and recognizes them. She is Felice Adams, the sister of Oscar's ex-wife, Blanche. Felix's eyes light up when he learns that her husband died of a heart attack, and they are mutually attracted. He calls her "Lise," which causes Oscar to ask Felix if she calls him "Lix." They arrive at the wedding house, only to find that Brucey is having second thoughts about the wedding due to his parents' bad history with marriage. Felix and Oscar argue with their ex-wives, after which Oscar persuades his son to go through with it. Felix's suitcase is returned and the wedding goes off without a hitch.

The next day, Felix and Felice leave together on one flight to her home in San Francisco, and part ways with Oscar, who returns to Florida. Oscar is telling his poker friends about the wedding when the doorbell rings. It is Felix, who says things with Felice didn't work out. Felix wonders if he could move in with Oscar until he finds his own place. Oscar refuses, but eventually relents, insisting their days of being roommates will be over if Oscar catches Felix matching any of his socks, to which Felix very happily agrees. Before long Felix cleans up the apartment and Oscar is overcome with a sense of having been through all this before.

Cast

Production
Howard W. Koch, the producer of the original 1968 film by writer Neil Simon, had frequently discussed his desire for a sequel. Koch was unsuccessful in convincing Paramount Pictures to approve a sequel, despite the original film's success and the return of Simon as the writer. Simon had 37 pages written for The Odd Couple 2, which he said were left "sitting in the drawer" for 10 years. John Goldwyn and Paramount studio chairman Sherry Lansing began serious consideration of a sequel in July 1996, before announcing it on March 30, 1997, without the involvement of Koch; instead, Paramount chose Robert W. Cort and Dave Madden as producers for the project. Silverman, Baranski, and Hughes were cast in May 1997.

Filming began on June 9, 1997, in Los Angeles, California. Filming continued throughout the summer in various southern and central California cities, including Arcadia, Guadalupe, Lancaster, Palmdale, Pomona, San Luis Obispo, Santa Maria, and Shafter. In August 1997, filming was underway at the same Paramount Studios stage where the original film had been shot. Filming also took place at Hidden Valley, located in Ventura County, California. The film was shot with the title The Odd Couple II — Travelin' Light. The film marked the tenth and final collaboration between Lemmon and Matthau. Jean Smart described the characters of Thelma and Holly as "a bad '90s version of the Pigeon sisters," characters who appeared in the original film.

Reception
The Odd Couple II  was a critical and commercial failure. Despite the fact Lemmon and Matthau had success with similar roles in their Grumpy Old Men films in the mid-1990s, this project was not as successful as expected. The film grossed $18 million at the North American domestic box office, and although Lemmon and Matthau's previous film Out to Sea also disappointed, it was better received by critics and had a slightly higher box office gross.

It holds a total of 27% on Rotten Tomatoes. Stephen Holden of The New York Times called it "a dispiriting, flavorless travesty, the equivalent of moldy tofu mystery meat".

Audiences surveyed by CinemaScore gave the film a grade of "B+" on scale of A+ to F.

At the 1998 Stinkers Bad Movie Awards, the film was nominated for Worst Sequel and Most Painfully Unfunny Comedy.

References

External links
 
 
 
 
 
 

The Odd Couple
1998 films
1990s adventure comedy films
1990s buddy comedy films
1990s comedy road movies
American adventure comedy films
American buddy comedy films
American comedy road movies
American sequel films
Films about old age
Films scored by Alan Silvestri
Films based on works by Neil Simon
Films directed by Howard Deutch
Films shot in California
Films shot in Los Angeles
Paramount Pictures films
Films with screenplays by Neil Simon
1998 comedy films
1990s English-language films
1990s American films